A list of films produced by the Marathi language film industry based in Maharashtra in the year 1947.

1947 Releases
A list of Marathi films released in 1947.

References

External links
Gomolo - 

Lists of 1947 films by country or language
1947
1947 in Indian cinema